The Maldives women's national under-16 basketball team is the national basketball team of Maldives for Junior Women, governed by the Maldives Basketball Association. It represents the country in international under-16 women's basketball competitions.

The team participated for the first time during the 2017 FIBA Under-16 Women's Asian Championship in Bangalore, India, wherein they finished seventh in Division B.

Current roster
Maldives roster at the 5th FIBA Under-16 Women's Asian Championship:

References

Basketball teams in the Maldives
Women's national under-16 basketball teams
National sports teams of the Maldives
1997 establishments in the Maldives